Columellia is a group of plant species in the  Columelliaceae described as a genus in 1794.

Columellia is native to the Andes Mountains of western South America (Colombia, Ecuador, Peru, Bolivia).

Species
 Columellia lucida Danguy & Cherm. - Colombia, Ecuador, N Peru
 Columellia oblonga Ruiz & Pav. - Colombia, Ecuador, Peru, W Bolivia
 Columellia obovata Ruiz & Pav. - S Ecuador, Peru
 Columellia subsessilis Schltr.  - Bolivia
 Columellia weberbaueri Schltr. - Peru

References

Asterid genera
Bruniales